Roderic Norman Coote OBE (13 April 19156 July 2000) was an Anglican bishop who held three different posts in an ecclesiastical career spanning half a century.

Coote was the son of Commander Bernard Trotter Coote and Grace Harriet Robinson, daughter of the Very Reverend John Joseph Robinson. He was the grandson of Sir Algernon Coote, 12th Baronet, Lord-Lieutenant of Queen's County (see Coote baronets). Educated at Trinity College, Dublin and  ordained in 1939, he began his career with a curacy at St Bartholomew's, Dublin. After a decade as a missionary priest in The Gambia he became diocesan bishop (Bishop of Gambia and the Rio Pongas)  in 1951. Translated to Fulham in 1957, his final appointment was a sideways move to Bishop of Colchester nine years later. He became an area bishop with the creation of the Chelmsford area scheme 1983. An accomplished musician, he died just six months short of his 50th Episcopal anniversary.

Coote married Erica Lynette Shrubbs, daughter of Reverend Eric Gordon Shrubbs, in 1964. They had one son and two daughters. He died in July 2000, aged 85.

References

 

1915 births
Alumni of Trinity College Dublin
Anglican bishops of Gambia and the Rio Pongas
Bishops of Fulham
Bishops of Colchester
Officers of the Order of the British Empire
2000 deaths
Roderic
Anglicanism in the Gambia